Abhijit Roy may refer to:
 Abhijit Roy (cricketer)
 Abhijit Roy (politician)

See also
 Avijit Roy, Bangladeshi-American engineer and online activist